Dürrschweinnaab is a river of Bavaria, Germany. It is a right tributary of the Sauerbach river (Naab basin) in Upper Palatinate. It arises at Großenbühl (448 m) from the confluence of the Lohbach and the Schwarzenmoosbach, northeast of Parkstein.

See also
List of rivers of Bavaria

Rivers of Bavaria
Rivers of Germany